Mount Hornsby is a prominent snow-capped mountain on the south side of the middle reaches of Sjogren Glacier, Trinity Peninsula, Antarctica. It was mapped from surveys by the Falkland Islands Dependencies Survey (1960–61), and was named by the UK Antarctic Place-Names Committee after Richard Hornsby & Sons of Grantham, who designed and constructed several highly successful chain-track vehicles for the British War Office, the first "caterpillar tractors," in the years 1904–10.

Immediately south of Mount Hornsby, a wide col or notch called Shortcut Col provides a useful shortcut across the glacier. It was first mapped during surveys by the Falkland Islands Dependencies Survey (FIDS) of 1960–61. The United Kingdom Antarctic Place-Names Committee (UK-APC) officially named Shortcut Col because it provides a useful shortcut, avoiding the long detour through Longing Gap.

References

 SCAR Composite Antarctic Gazetteer.

Mountains of Trinity Peninsula